Richard L. Friedman is a real estate developer involved in multiple business, civic, and charitable endeavors. Friedman is the President and CEO of Carpenter & Company, Inc. of Cambridge, Massachusetts, a private firm involved in real estate and private investments.  Carpenter specializes in hotel development.

In 2000, President Bill Clinton appointed Friedman as Chairman of the National Capital Planning Commission.  In 2010, Friedman was appointed by President Barack Obama to the President’s Export Council. From May 2013 until January 1, 2020, Friedman was a Director of Four Seasons Hotels and Resorts. In June 2014, the Boston Globe reported that Friedman was developing a $700 Million, 61 story Four Seasons Hotel and Private Residences One Dalton Street in Boston's Back Bay. The building is the tallest building to be built in New England in the last 40 years.

Early life and education
Friedman was born in 1940 and raised in Brookline, Massachusetts, In 1963, Friedman graduated from Dartmouth College where he was a member of the ski team. After graduating, Friedman served as a Second Lieutenant in the Signal Corps the United States Army. From 1965 to 1971, he was the head coach of the Harvard College ski team.

Career
Friedman is the President and the Chief Executive Officer of Carpenter and Company, Inc.  At Carpenter, Friedman has developed dozens of real estate projects, including hotels, office buildings, and shopping centers.  One of Friedman's most notable projects is the development of the Liberty Hotel in Boston, Massachusetts, located in the former Charles Street Jail, and a historic landmark listed on the National Register of Historic Places.  Other notable projects include the St. Regis Hotel San Francisco, Charles Square and the Charles Hotel in Harvard Square, the Brookline Marriott Courtyard in Brookline, Massachusetts, and numerous Hyatt hotels.  
Friedman was appointed by President Clinton as Chairman of the National Capital Planning Commission and led its Interagency Security Task Force.  The National Capital Planning Commission is the federal government’s central planning agency for Washington, D.C. and portions of Maryland and Virginia. In 2010, Friedman was appointed by President Obama to the President’s Export Council, where he served as the Vice Chairman of the Subcommittee on Manufacturing and Services.

Friedman has also been extensively involved in civic and charitable endeavors including the Steppingstone Foundation, Mount Auburn Foundation, and the John F. Kennedy Presidential Library & Museum.

The Boston Globe reported in June, 2014 that Friedman was building a new Four Seasons Hotel and Private Residences One Dalton Street project in Boston.  One Dalton is New England's tallest residential building and has transformed the Boston skyline.

In March 2015, a team led by Friedman was selected to redevelop the former New Orleans World Trade Center into the Four Seasons Hotel and Private Residences New Orleans.

Friedman's firm, Carpenter, is currently developing a 250-room, $160 million EDITION Hotel in Reykjavik, Iceland.

Liberty Hotel and Charles Hotel
The Liberty project has received numerous accolades including:

Honors, affiliations, and awards

Personal life
Boston Magazine listed Friedman as one of Boston’s most powerful people.  Friedman’s summer home on Martha's Vineyard served as the summer White House for President Clinton and family for eight visits between 1993 and 2000. He has two children. Friedman is a member of the Screen Actors Guild and has performed in a number of Hollywood movies.

References

External links
 Carpenter and Company Official Website
 Four Seasons Hotel and Private Residences One Dalton Street official website
 Power- Boston Magazine
 International Business- New York Times
 
 

1941 births
Living people
American real estate businesspeople
Businesspeople from Massachusetts
Jewish American philanthropists
Dartmouth College alumni
United States Army officers
Brookline High School alumni
American chief executives
21st-century American Jews